Bruce Seldon vs. Mike Tyson, billed as Liberation, was a professional boxing match fought on September 7, 1996 for the WBA heavyweight championship.

The fight was part of a pay-per-view event produced by Don King Productions and carried on pay-per-view by Showtime.

The fight is notable in the fact that in attendance was rapper Tupac Shakur, who would be fatally shot just hours after the fight, following an altercation with Crip Orlando "Baby Lane" Anderson at the casino. Shakur died six days later on September 13 from ballistic trauma.

Background
After George Foreman was stripped of his WBA Heavyweight title for refusing to fight number one contender Tony Tucker, the WBA organized a fight between Tucker and little–known Bruce Seldon to determine who would become WBA Heavyweight champion. Seldon was able to defeat the aging Tucker by referee technical decision after the fight was stopped in the seventh round due to Tucker's eye being completely swollen shut. He would then successfully defend the title against Joe Hipp, who became the first Native American to challenge for a major heavyweight title, on the undercard of the Tyson–McNeeley fight on September 7, 1995.

Since being released from prison, Mike Tyson had won all three of his fights in dominating fashion, easily defeating obscure fighters Peter McNeeley and Buster Mathis, Jr. before capturing the WBC Heavyweight title by defeating Frank Bruno via 3rd-round knockout. However, Tyson would now have to deal with the WBC's number one contender, Lennox Lewis, who was guaranteed a title match against the winner of the Tyson–Bruno fight. Rather than face Lewis, Tyson paid Lewis $4 million in order to step aside and allow Tyson to face Seldon for the WBA Heavyweight title.

The fight
Tyson easily defeated Seldon by 1st-round knockout in one of the shortest Heavyweight championship fights in boxing history, lasting just 1:49. Tyson was the aggressor from the opening bell. Seldon attempted to weather Tyson’s storm by attempting to connect his powerful left jab, but Tyson was able to dodge Seldon’s attempts. At around 1:12 of the fight, Seldon was knocked down by a left hook thrown by Tyson, immediately followed by a straight right that only grazed Seldon. Seldon answered the referee’s count at 8 and continued the fight only to almost immediately get knocked down again by another left hook. Seldon got back on his feet but was unable to maintain his balance, causing referee Richard Steele to stop the fight and award Tyson the victory by  technical knockout.

"Fix" controversy
Almost immediately after the fight, the audience began chanting "Fix!", having thought Seldon took a dive in order for Tyson to win the championship and move on to face Evander Holyfield. The crowd would continue to serenade Seldon with chants of "Fix!" as he remained in the ring for an interview with Jim Gray. Gray would openly ask Seldon if he did in fact take a dive, but Seldon professed his innocence, stating "I didn't train 12 weeks to come in here and take a dive."

Aftermath
After his embarrassing loss, Seldon would retire from boxing, eventually staging a comeback in 2004 at the age of 37. Meanwhile, Tyson would officially vacate his WBC title and proceed with his much anticipated match with Holyfield for the WBA Heavyweight championship. Though Tyson was 6–1 favorite, Holyfield had then scored a stunning upset victory by defeating Tyson via 11th-round technical knockout. Tyson would subsequently lose the rematch by disqualification in 1997 as well as his next Heavyweight title match in 2002 against Lennox Lewis. As such, the Seldon match would be Tyson's final heavyweight championship victory.

Rapper Tupac Shakur was attending the fight that night, and was fatally shot after the fight in a drive-by shooting. He died six days later on September 13, 1996 at 4:03 pm.

References

World Boxing Association heavyweight championship matches
1996 in boxing
Boxing in Las Vegas
Boxing on Showtime
1996 in sports in Nevada
Boxing matches involving Mike Tyson
Tupac Shakur
September 1996 sports events in the United States
MGM Grand Garden Arena